Franny's Feet is a Canadian animated children's television series created by writer Cathy Moss and fellow Susin Nielsen. The series was produced by Decode Entertainment (with the participation of Family Channel), in association with Channel Five Broadcasting Limited (seasons 1 and 2). The series follows the adventures of Frances "Franny" Fantootsie (a name combination of "fantasy" and "tootsie") as she tries on a new shoe and travels to different countries.

Franny's Feet first aired on Family Channel in Canada on July 8, 2003 and concluded on October 31, 2010. It also aired on PBS Kids in the US and on Five in the UK. The series aired for three seasons and 52 episodes.

Summary
A 5-year-old girl named Franny visits with her grandfather every day at his shoe repair shop in Vancouver, Canada. They talk about all matters until a customer comes. The customer presents shoes needing to be repaired to her grandfather, and he gives the pair to Franny to place inside the shoe repair box. Franny tries on the footwear and they take her to a magical place such as a Native American powwow in Wyoming, a sunny beach in Jamaica, or a high mountain in China. At the end of each episode, after Franny solves the problem in a magical place, she receives a treasure and adds it to her treasure box and solves her own problem.

The show is designed to teach children about the joys of exploring for the first time.

Cast

Main
 Phoebe McAuley (speaking voice)/Tajja Isen (singing voice, theme music only) as Franny Fantootsie
 George Buza as Grandpa

Supporting
 Katie Johnson as Judy
 Juan Chioran as Nat the Yak
 Stacey DePass as Kinka the Kinkajou/Sally the Tough Old Cat/Jerry the Penguin/Darlene the Duck
 Tajja Isen as Lacey/Princess Tia
 Scott Beaudin as Fritz 
 Melanie Tonello as Penny the Artist's Daughter
 Julie Lemieux as Bobby Jean the Hen/Zelda the Wild Boar/Susan the Sloth
 Scott McCord as Charlie the Bronco/Brady the Fire Dog
 Alex House as Zuca the Kinkajou
 Annick Obonsawin as Desta the Ostrich
 Robert Tinkler as Salsa the Donkey
 Sunday Muse as Li-Mei the Chinese Girl
 Jordan Francis as Johnny the Jamaican Boy
 Dwayne Hill as Joey the Canadian Digger Boy
 Connor Price as George the Mouse
 Amos Crawley as Henry the Mouse/Spencer the Skunk
 Adrian Truss as Joanna the Pirate Girl
 Martin Roach as Joey the Dogsled
 Thomas Callaway as Oxie the Oxpecker/Gus the Fish
 Stephanie Anne Mills as Ice-Skater Customer/Marie the Blonde-Haired Girl/Lulu the Loon
 Mark McMulkin as Jacques the Hockey Player
 Mark Rendall as Adam the Camper
 Teri Hawkes as Jessie the Music Star
 Tracey Moore as Li-Wei the Chinese Girl
 Colin Soleman as Pixie the Horse
 Jonathan Wilson as Morrison the Monkey/Galileo
 Ron Rubin as Rudy the Kangaroo
 Hadley Kay as Sarah the Rider
 Alyson Court as Meena the Butterfly
 Chris Netherton as Tony
 Peter Oldring as Randall the Duck and Ralph the Hare
 Barbara Mamabolo as additional voices

Episodes

Season 1 (2003)
 101. Wonderful Woolies/A Home for Herman (July 8, 2003)
 102. Small is Nice/Opening Night Jitters (July 26, 2003)
 103. Not Yeti/Jingle Dress (August 2, 2003)
 104. Ride e’m Cowboy/Monkey Stuff (August 9, 2003)
 105. You Bug Me/Double Trouble (August 16, 2003)
 106. Paper Presents/Fowl Weather (August 23, 2003)
 107. Egg Sitting/Arctic Antics (August 30, 2003)
 108. Under The Sea/Bedtime For Bears (September 13, 2003)
 109. A Visit to the Vet/Game Over (September 19, 2003)
 110. Lonely Library/What’s So Funny? (September 22, 2003)
 111. Paint Job/Yummy in My Tummy (September 26, 2003)
 112. Whiz Kid/Birds of a Feather (October 11, 2003)
 113. Fancy Footwork/Say Jamaica (October 31, 2003)

Season 2 (2004–2007)
 201. Franny’s Manners/Swamp Thing (March 14, 2004)
 202. A Pirate’s Treasure/Nat The Yak (April 26, 2004)
 203. Hop To It/Make Them Laugh (May 10, 2004)
 204. Night Time/Bear Facts (July 24, 2004)
 205. Jumbo Jinx/The Fais Do Do (September 4, 2004)
 206. Messy Monkey/Greece Is The Word (September 8, 2004)
 207. Princess Tia/Chez Lou Lou (September 12, 2004)
 208. Sweet Mystery/A Standout Performance (October 16, 2004)
 209. Long Stories/Best In Show (October 30, 2004)
 210. Reindeer To The Rescue/Bright Idea (December 4, 2004)
 211. A Pony Tale/Puppet Pals (February 12, 2005)
 212. Octopus’s Garden/The Colossal Fossil (March 5, 2005)
 213. The Big Race/It’s A Big Job (July 12, 2005)
 214. Pink Flamingos/Granny Nanny Goat (August 4, 2005)
 215. A Little Moose Music/The Great Museum Caper (October 22, 2005)
 216. Franny and Five-Pin/Net Worth (November 5, 2005)
 217. Iguana Play Paddle Ball/Lighthouse Lily (March 18, 2006)
 218. Like Magic/Scatterbrained Squirrel (May 13, 2006)
 219. Armadillo Allergy/Bee Patient (September 2, 2006)
 220. Unhappy Hippo/Westward Ho (September 30, 2006)
 221. Happy Halloween/Tunnel Vision (November 25, 2006)
 222. Shiver Me Timbers/Mount Do It Later (January 13, 2007)
 223. Mischievous Magpies/Snowy Jamaica (May 12, 2007)
 224. Lost In Mexico/It’s Snow Small Feat (July 21, 2007)
 225. Pilot Project/Season’s Greetings (August 25, 2007)
 226. There's No Place Like Home/Old Friends, New Friends (October 13, 2007)

Season 3 (2009–2010)
 301. Stargazing/Tower Power (September 10, 2009)
 302. Slippery Sandcastle/Butterfingers (September 17, 2009)
 303. Picture This/Sound Advice (September 24, 2009)
 304. Rainforest Games/Shake Those Beans (October 1, 2009)
 305. Flight of Fancy/Totem Trouble (October 8, 2009)
 306. Papa Penguin/Ballroom Bugaboo (October 15, 2009)
 307. Wedding Day Woe/A Perfect Fit (October 22, 2009)
 308. On Your Toes/It Figures (October 29, 2009)
 309. Iwi the Kiwi/Clothes Call (December 3, 2010)
 310. Lots of Space/Tulip Parade (December 10, 2010)
 311. Pandamonium/So to Speak (December 17, 2010)
 312. Sweet Talk/Light in the Night (December 24, 2010)
 313. Going Ape!/Halloween Harvest (December 31, 2010)

Broadcast
The series first aired on Family Channel in Canada on July 8, 2003 and concluded on October 31, 2010. It also aired on PBS Kids in the US -- co-funded by WNET (listed as co-producer for the series) -- and on Five in the UK.

The series also aired on V-me in Spanish (with the title Los pies mágicos de Franny). It also reran on Light TV (now TheGrio TV) in the late 2010s.

Home media 
Phase 4 Films' Kaboom! Entertainment released seven volumes on DVD. , the series is available on Tubi.

Franny's Treasures 
Select segments were edited (to fit the short-length format) for the spin-off titled Franny's Treasures, broadcast in Canada on YTV in the early 2010s (also on Discovery Kids in Latin America and on PBS Kids Sprout in the US). The spin-off featured concepts that were explored in each preceding segment.

References

External links
 

2000s Canadian animated television series
2010s Canadian animated television series
2003 Canadian television series debuts
2011 Canadian television series endings
Canadian children's animated comedy television series
Canadian children's animated fantasy television series
Canadian flash animated television series
Canadian preschool education television series
Animated preschool education television series
2000s preschool education television series
2010s preschool education television series
English-language television shows
Family Channel (Canadian TV network) original programming
Family Jr. original programming
PBS Kids shows
Television series by DHX Media
Television shows set in Vancouver
Television shows filmed in Toronto
Animated television series about children